Holly Lisle (born 1960) is an American writer of fantasy, science fiction, paranormal romance and romantic suspense novels.  She is also known for her work in educating writers, including her e-book Mugging the Muse: Writing Fiction for Love And Money, starting the Forward Motion Writers' Community web site, and her novel-writing and revision courses How to Think Sideways.

Bibliography
Unless otherwise noted, books on this list are fantasy.

Series

Arhel
1992 Fire in the Mist (Compton Crook Award winner)
1993 Bones of the Past
1995 Mind of the Magic

Glenraven
Co-authored with Marion Zimmer Bradley
1996 Glenraven
1998 In the Rift – Glenraven II

Devil's Point
1996 Sympathy for the Devil 
1996 The Devil and Dan Cooley (with Walter Spence)
1997 Hell on High (with Ted Nolan)

Bard's Tale
1996 Thunder of the Captains (with Aaron Allston)
1997 Wrath of the Princes (with Aaron Allston)
1998 Curse of the Black Heron

The Secret Texts
2002 Vincalis the Agitator (a prequel to the other three books which form a trilogy)
1998 Diplomacy of Wolves
1999 Vengeance of Dragons
2000 Courage of Falcons

World Gates
2002 Memory of Fire
2003 The Wreck of Heaven
2004 Gods Old and Dark

Korre
2005 Talyn
2008 Hawkspar
Yet to be Published: Redbird

Moon and Sun
2008 The Ruby Key
2009 The Silver Door
Cadence Drake (Science Fiction)
 1997 Hunting the Corrigan's Blood
 2012 Warpaint
Tales from the Longview (set in the same universe as the Cadence Drake series)  (Science Fiction)
 2017 Born From Fire (originally published as "Enter The Death Circus" in 2014)
 2017 The Selling of Suzee Delight
 2017 The Philosopher Gambit
 2017 Gunslinger Moon
 2018 Vipers’ Nest
Short Fiction
 Armor-ella
 Bad Bottle

Other fiction
1992 When the Bough Breaks (with Mercedes Lackey, set in the SERRAted Edge series)
1993 Minerva Wakes
1994 The Rose Sea (with S.M. Stirling)
1995 Mall, Mayhem and Magic (with Chris Guin)
2004 Midnight Rain (paranormal romantic suspense)
2005 Last Girl Dancing (paranormal romantic suspense)
2006 I See You (paranormal romantic suspense)
2007 Night Echoes (paranormal romantic suspense)

Books for writers (non-fiction)
2000 Mugging the Muse: Writing Fiction for Love and Money (non-fiction) (e-book)
2006 Create a Character Clinic (non-fiction) (e-book, available via the author's web shop)
2006 Create a Language Clinic (non-fiction) (e-book)
2006 Create a Culture Clinic (non-fiction) (e-book)
2007 Create a Plot Clinic (non-fiction) (e-book)
2008 How to write page-turning scenes (non-fiction) (e-book)
2014: Create a World Clinic (non-fiction) (e-book)

References

External links
Official web site
 Interview at SFFWorld.com

1960 births
Living people
American fantasy writers
Women science fiction and fantasy writers
20th-century American women writers
21st-century American women writers
20th-century American novelists
21st-century American novelists
Writers of books about writing fiction
American women novelists